is a 1993 adventure video game that was released exclusively in Japan. A fan translation group released an unofficial English translation patch for the game on December 28, 2018.

Gameplay

The story depicts the action as taking place in the utopian world of Ihatovo.

The game focuses on collecting information (notebooks from Miyazawa's fairy tales) and items (that are related to those fairy tales) instead of fighting monsters. The game is broken up into eight chapters, each of which tells its own story in which the player helps the denizens of Ihatovo, often featuring talking animals.

Inspired by the stories of Kenji Miyazawa, the story covers nine chapters and surreal environments. The ending involves speaking to Mr. Miyazawa himself and boarding on the Galaxy Railroad train.

References

1993 video games
Adventure games
Japan-exclusive video games
Hect games
Satellaview games
Super Nintendo Entertainment System games
Super Nintendo Entertainment System-only games
Video games developed in Japan
Video games scored by Tsukasa Tawada